The 2001–02 Wake Forest Demon Deacons men's basketball team represented Wake Forest University as a member of the Atlantic Coast Conference during the 2001–02 NCAA Division I men's basketball season. Led by head coach Skip Prosser, the team played their home games at Lawrence Joel Veterans Memorial Coliseum in Winston-Salem, North Carolina. The Demon Deacons finished tied for third in the ACC regular season standings. They lost to Duke in the semifinals of the ACC Tournament. Wake Forest received an at-large bid to the NCAA tournament as the No. 7 seed in the Midwest region.

Roster

Schedule and results

|-
!colspan=9 style=| Regular Season

|-
!colspan=9 style=| ACC Tournament

|-
!colspan=9 style=| NCAA Tournament

Rankings

References

Wake Forest Demon Deacons men's basketball seasons
Wake Forest
Wake Forest